Bert Thompson may refer to:

Bert Thompson (musician) who worked with John C. Marshall (musician), see :de:Bert Thompson
Bert Thompson (Canadian politician), candidate in 2009 Nova Scotia general election and Dartmouth East
Bert Thompson, character in Holiday on the Buses played by Wilfrid Brambell
Bert Thompson (Christian apologist), see Level of support for evolution

See also
Albert Thompson (disambiguation)
Robert Thompson (disambiguation)
Herbert Thompson (disambiguation)
Bertie Thompson, athlete
Bert Thomson (disambiguation)